Monumenta Nipponica is a semi-annual academic journal of Japanese studies. Published by Sophia University (Tokyo), it is one of the oldest English-language academic journals in the field of Asian studies, being founded in 1938. Although the journal originally published articles in several languages, such as French, German, Spanish, and Italian, the journal has been published solely in English since early 1963. A series of 75 monographs were also published until 1986 under the Monumenta Nipponica name.

A symposium was held at Sophia University on October 6, 2018 to commemorate the 80-year anniversary of Monumenta Nipponica’s founding. Videos of the symposium are available on YouTube. In 2020, Sophia University published a special issue commemorating Monumenta Nipponica’s 80-year founding, showcasing the people who made the journal happen and noteworthy historical events.

Contents 
Each issue contains two to three main research articles, and around twenty reviews of recent books in Japanese studies, dealing with Japanese society, culture, history, religion, literature, art, anthropology, and related topics in Japanese and Asian studies. The journal occasionally publishes translations of Japanese-language works and English-language reviews of noteworthy books on Japanese studies that were published in other European languages, particularly German and French.

In addition to the printed journal, Monumenta Nipponica’s content can be accessed via 3 websites.

 The list of all the issues and the titles of the articles and other content can be found at its Sophia University home page.  Each item has a link for easy access at the appropriate hosting site.  
 The most recent issue is available through Project MUSE.  They also host back issues starting with volume 60, which was published in 2005.
 The majority of Monumenta Nipponica’s back issues, from 1938 up to 5 years before the most recent issue, are accessible through JSTOR.

Editors-in Chief 
The following persons have been editors-in-chief of Monumenta Nipponica:
 Vols. 1–6 (1938–1943)—Johannes B. Kraus (founder)
 Vols. 7–16 (1951–1961)—Wilhelm Schiffer
 Vols. 17–18 (1962–1963)—Wilhelm Schiffer, Francis Mathy
 Vols. 19–23 (1964–1968)—Joseph Pittau
 Vols. 24–25 (1969–1970)—Edmund R. Skrzypczak
 Vols. 26–52:1 (1971–1997)—Michael Cooper
 Vols. 52:2–65:1 (1997–2010)—Kate Wildman Nakai
 Vols. 65:2–67:2 (2010–2012)—Mark R. Mullins
 Vols. 68:1–69:2 (2013–2014)—Richard A. Gardner, Caroline Hirasawa
 Vols. 70:1–70:2 (2015)—Richard A. Gardner, Bettina Gramlich-Oka
 Vols. 71:1–72:2 (2016–2017)—Bettina Gramlich-Oka, Sven Saaler
Vols. 73:1– (2018–present)—Bettina Gramlich-Oka

References

Further reading 
 
“Monumenta Nipponica: Eighty Years and Counting.” 2020. Retrieved 2021-02-22.

External links 
 
Monumenta Nipponica on Project MUSE
Monumenta Nipponica on JSTOR
Monumenta Nipponica 80th Anniversary Symposium on YouTube

Japanese studies journals
Publications established in 1938
English-language journals
Biannual journals
Academic journals published by universities and colleges
1938 establishments in Japan